South Kilvington is a village and civil parish in the Hambleton district of North Yorkshire, England. It is situated just off the A19, about one mile north of Thirsk.

History

The village is mentioned in the Domesday Book as Cheluitun in the Yarlestre hundred. The entry refers to the area around North Kilvington that was owned by Earl Edwin at the time of the Norman invasion and then granted to the Crown. During the 13th century, the lands became the demesne of Roger de Mowbray and around 1637, after many lands had been divided, the lord of the manor was Sir Arthur Ingram.

Henry Percy, 4th Earl of Northumberland was supposedly killed here in 1489 by a mob of protesters against taxation.

Thornbrough House in the parish of South Kilvington was home to Matthew Carter who died there in 1666 at the reported age of 112. His life would have spanned the reigns of six monarchs from Mary I to Charles II, the English Civil War and Restoration. Whilst Carter did not match the claimed longevity of fellow Yorkshire supercentenarian Henry Jenkins, they were contemporaries.

In the 19th century, South Kilvington was widely known for its village idiots who became a popular spectacle for visitors.

Governance

South Kilvington lies within the Thirsk and Malton UK Parliament constituency; the Thirsk electoral division of North Yorkshire County Council, and the Whitestonecliffe ward of Hambleton District Council.

Geography

The original route of the A19 used to run through the village, it is now the A61. Cod Beck flows to the west of the village as part of the tributary system of the River Swale.

The 1881 UK Census recorded the population as 261. In the 2001 census, the parish had a population of 231 of which 205 were over sixteen years old and 102 of those were in employment. There were 112 dwellings of which 72 were detached.

Education

, South Kilvington CE VC Primary school has just under 100 pupils on roll, aged from 4 to 11 years old and is in the catchment area for Thirsk School and Sixth Form College.

Religion

St Wilfrid's church is thought to date from the reign of Henry III though Saxon cross fragments found in the churchyard indicate there may have been an older structure on the site. The church is a Grade II* listed building.

References

External links

Villages in North Yorkshire
Civil parishes in North Yorkshire
Hambleton District